The Qingshan Group is a geological group in Shandong, China, whose strata date back to the Barremian to Albian stages of the Early Cretaceous. The group contains the Doushan Formation. Dinosaur remains are among the fossils that have been recovered from the formation.

Fossil content 
The following fossils were reported from the Doushan Formation:
 Pachygenys thlastesa
 Psittacosaurus sinensis - "More than [twenty] individuals,[five] complete skulls, [three] articulated skeletons."
 P. youngi "Partial skeleton with skull."
 Possible indeterminate dsungaripterid pterosaur remains
 Indeterminate titanosaur remains

See also 
 List of dinosaur-bearing rock formations

References

Bibliography 

  
 
 
 

Geologic groups of Asia
Geologic formations of China
Lower Cretaceous Series of Asia
Cretaceous China
Albian Stage
Aptian Stage
Barremian Stage
Mudstone formations
Sandstone formations
Shale formations
Tuff formations
Paleontology in Shandong